WJKK (98.7 FM) is a mainstream adult contemporary radio station.  Although licensed to Vicksburg, the station serves the Jackson area.  The station is currently owned by Meridian-based New South Radio.  Its studios are located in Ridgeland and the transmitter site is in Raymond.

Mix has provided Jackson's best variety of soft rock since their flip from country music in 1997. More recently the station has been becoming more upbeat following a trend of many AC stations across the country.

References

External links
Mix 98.7 website

JKK
Mainstream adult contemporary radio stations in the United States
The Radio People radio stations